Pippa Van Iersel (born July 1, 1999, in Hoorn) is an Dutchwoman female kite surfer. She is a presence the GKA World Tour kiteboarding contests and Big Air Kite League (BAKL) and she has been the Kitesurf Dutch Champion since 2016. Van Iersel is sponsored by Duotone and O'Neill.

Titles
3rd place GKA Air Games 2018
3rd place GKA Freestyle 2019
3rd place GKA Freestyle 2020
3rd place GKA Freestyle 2021
1st place BAKL Brazil September 2021
1st place BAKL France October 2021
1st place BAKL Lords of Tram April 2022
3rd place BAKL Full Power Tarifa May 2022

References

External links
Official site

1999 births
Dutch kitesurfers
Living people
Female kitesurfers